The YF-23 is a liquid rocket vernier engine, burning N2O4 and UDMH. It is used in along the YF-22 to form the YF-24 and YF-25 propulsion modules.

Versions
The basic engine has been used since the Feng Bao 1 rocket and has been the vernier propulsion of the Long March 2, Long March 3 and Long March 4 families second stage.

 YF-23: Original version.
 YF-23B (AKA DaFY21-1): Improved version.
 YF-23F: Improved version.

Modules
This engine is bundled into modules along the YF-22 upper stage engine.

The relevant modules for second stage application are:
 YF-24: A module comprising an YF-22 and a single YF-23 verniers.
 YF-24B: A module comprising an YF-22B and a single YF-23B verniers.
 YF-24E: A module comprising an YF-22E and a single YF-23F verniers.

References

Rocket engines of China
Rocket engines using hypergolic propellant